Such a Greyhound is a 1931 German musical comedy film directed by Carl Heinz Wolff and starring Ralph Arthur Roberts, Max Adalbert, and Lucie Englisch. It was shot at the Babelsberg Studios in Berlin.

Cast

References

Bibliography 
 Klaus, Ulrich J. Deutsche Tonfilme: Jahrgang 1931. Klaus-Archiv, 2006.

External links 
 

1931 films
1931 musical comedy films
German musical comedy films
Films of the Weimar Republic
1930s German-language films
Films directed by Carl Heinz Wolff
German films based on plays
German black-and-white films
1930s German films
Films shot at Babelsberg Studios